Omar or Omar Farouk is a historical Arab television drama miniseries-serial that was produced and broadcast by MBC1 and directed by the Syrian director Hatem Ali. Co-produced by Qatar TV, the series is based on the life of Omar ibn al-Khattab (also spelled 'Umar',  583–644), the second Caliph of Islam, and depicts his life from 18 years old until the moments of his death.

The series faced large controversies due to its depiction of Omar, Abu Bakr, Uthman and Ali, the four Rashidun Caliphs, along with other characters, who some Muslims believe should not be depicted, much like Mohammad. The series consists of 31 episodes and was originally aired in the month of Ramadan since July 20, 2012. It was made at a cost of 200 million Saudi riyals and filmed in Morocco, primarily in the cities of Marakesh, Tangiers, El Jadida, Casablanca and Mohammedia.

After the series was broadcast on MBC, it was dubbed into several languages for international broadcast and subtitled in English on YouTube; it received great support from many different Sunni scholarly bodies and people watching it.

Synopsis
The series starts with one of the pilgrimage of caliph Omar where he delivers speeches to the pilgrims. The next scene comes with an exploration on Mecca of the caliph where he emotionally flashbacks to his own 18 year's life when he was a young boy working for his rude father Khattab ibn Nufayl. The flashback perspective of Omar shows all the past story of his life from when he was a wrestler, a businessman and above all one of the leaders of the Quraish, and then to his life after his conversion into Islam being one of the closest companions of Muhammad and an immensely devoted believer, a brave inspiration for all the contemporary Muslims and a bold warrior in all the contemporary Islamic battles. The story goes through the Meccan victory, Muhammad's death, Abu Bakr's legacy as caliph and his death, and finally Omar's legacy. From viewer's eye perspective, his legacy as caliph shows the biographical stories of improvements and complexities of his own caliphate till his assassination by Abu Lulu.

Cast

 Samer Ismail as Umar ibn Al-Khattab (physical actor) 
 Assad Khalifa as Umar ibn Al-Khattab (voice actor)
 Ghassan Massoud as Abu Bakr
 Mehyar Khaddour as Khalid ibn al-Walid
 Tamer Al-Arbeed as Uthman ibn Affan 
 Ghanem Zrelli as Ali ibn Abi Talib 
 Faisal Al-Omairi as Bilal ibn Rabah 
 Alaa' Rashidi as Ammar ibn Yasir 
 Rafi Wahba as Jafar ibn Abi Talib 
 Abdullah Sheikh Khamees as Yasir ibn Amer
 Baha' Tharwat as Abu Hudhayfa ibn 'Utba
 Abdel-Aziz Makhioun as Abu Talib 
 Mohammad Miftah as Hamza ibn Abdul-Muttalib.
 Ahmed Mansour as Abd al-Rahman ibn Awf
 Mahmoud Khalili as Abu Ubaidah ibn al-Jarrah 
 Suhail Jbaei as Sa`d ibn Abi Waqqas 
 Qasim Melho as Amr ibn al-'As
 Hisham Bahloul as Ikrimah ibn Abi Jahl 
 Yazan Al-Sayed as Al-Qa'qa'a ibn Amr at-Tamimi 
 Fethi Haddaoui as Abu Sufyan ibn Harb 
 Jawad Al-Shakrji as Abu al-Hakam/Abu Jahl.
 Fayez Abu Dan as Abu Lahab
 Hassan Al-Jundi as Utbah ibn Rabi'ah
 Rafiq Al-Subaiei as Waraqah ibn Nawfal
 Ghazi Hussein as Umayyah ibn Khalaf 
 Jalal Al-Taweel as Salman the Persian 
 Ziad Twati as Wahshi ibn Harb
 Basem Dakak as Walid ibn Utbah 
 May Skaf as Hind bint Utbah
 Bernadette Hudeib as Rayhana bint Zayd 
 Fadi Sbeeh as Safwan ibn Umayya 
 Mohammad Haddaqi as Umayr ibn Wahb 
 Nadera Imran as Sajah bint Al-Harith 
 Khaled Al-Qaish as Ayyash ibn Abi Rabiah
 Jaber Joukhdar as Abdullah ibn Masud
 Ghazwan Al-Safadi as Al-Walid ibn al-Walid
 Mahmoud Nasr as Zayd ibn al-Khattab 
 Alfat Omar as Atiqa bint Zayd
 Siham Aseef as Layla bint al-Minhal
 Najah Safkouni as Suhayl ibn Amr 
 Abdel-Karim Al-Qawasmi as Walid ibn al-Mughira 
 Rami Khalaf as Saeed bin Zaid
 Ghassan Azb as Huyayy ibn Akhtab 
 Riyadh Wrdiyani as Salul 
 Nasser Wrdiyani as Khattab ibn Nufayl
 Muna Wassef as Al-Shifa' bint Abdullah. 
 Abdel-Hakim Quteifan as Malik ibn Nuwayrah
 Mohannad Quteish as Al-Muthanna ibn Haritha
 Faten Shahin as Umm Jamil bint Harb 
 Andre Skaff as Suraqa bin Malik 
 Fatimah Saad as Sumayyah bint Khayyat 
 Qamar Murtadha as Salma Umm-ul-Khair 
 Nasr Shama as Uthman Abu Quhafa
 Murshad Dergham as Mughira ibn Shu'ba 
 Randy Halabi as Yazid ibn Abi Sufyan 
 Omar Azouzi as Al-'As ibn Wa'il 
 Areej Khaddour as Fatimah bint al-Khattab 
 Amn Al-Arned as Salim Mawla Abu Hudhayfa 
 Yasser Abdel-Latif as Al-Najashi
 Amer Ali as Yazdegerd III 
 Maram Ben Aziza as wife of Yazdegerd III (Maria)
 Jay Abdo as satrap
 Iyad Abu Al-Shamat as Hormuzan 
 Jamal Abbasi as	Musaylimah 
 Mohammad Al Rashi as Abu Lu'lu'a Firuz
 Suzan Najm Aldeen as Borandukht
 Juliet Awad as Al-Khansa
 Mohammad Quri'ah as Heraclius
 Mustapha Tah-Tah as Mukhayriq
 Unknown Actor as Theodore Trithyrius

List of episodes

Production

The project was started on 30 September 2010 through an agreement signed by Middle East Broadcasting Center  and Qatar Media agency (Qatar TV) to make a drama series on the life of Caliph Omar, scheduled to be aired during the Ramadan of 2011.  The chief of MBC group Waleed al Ibrahim stated that, the drama would not aim at profits:

Saudi producers, the Middle East Broadcasting Center (MBC), said the series is the largest ever Arabic production, with 30,000 actors and a technical team from 10 countries who toiled 300 days to make the 31-part series. The director Ali said that building a replica of Mecca and the surrounding area was a challenge that faced him until he and the crew finally chose a location in Morocco. The series needed a huge crew amount to 500 actors, actresses, and extras in one single day. Ali also pointed out, several scenes in the series were difficult to shoot like which elephant treads on one of the actors.

The horses used in the series were brought from Eastern Europe and were trained together with the elephants to make them adapt to each other. The series featured many battle scenes on a large scale. Ali said it took them a total of 54 days with a rate of 12 hours a day and with the participation of 500 extras that were trained on this type of scenes.

Two actors of this series, Hassan Al-Jundi and Muna Wassef, both acted (as Abu Jahl and Hind respectively) in the 1970s Arabic language film Al Risalah (الرسالة), the version of Moustapha Akkad's religious biopic The Message (a.k.a. Mohammad, Messenger of God) made for the Arab World.
Hassan Al-Jundi also acted as Kisra in the English language film while his counterpart in Al Risalah played the character of Abu Jahl in the same film.

Hatem Ali commented that other filmmakers would follow in his footsteps with this taboo broken by him by portraying sensitive early Islamic peronalities like Rashidun Caliphs, by pointing to Majid Majidi, who was then developing the feature film Muhammad: The Messenger of God about the Islamic prophet Muhammad's childhood.

Committee members for managing historical context
A board committee of scholars was created for maintaining the historicity of the script. The major members of the board were:
Yusuf al-Qaradawi
Akram Zia Omari
Salman al-Awda
Abdul Wahab Turairi
Ali al-Sallabi
Saad Al-Otaibi

VFX effects

Most of the episodes of the series contained many expensive computer-generated imagery (CGI) effects which were maintained by French CGI production BUF in association with Hecat, as well as title and ending theme also. Moreover, the sets of ancient Mecca and Medina and other sites in Arabia and elsewhere in the post classical era were also produced by the Soora Studio, a Syrian set producer production, which previously made the sets of many other popular Arabic dramas.

Music
The original soundtrack was composed by Turkish musician Fahir Atakoglu. A nasheed or Arabic song praising Omar and describing a complete archive of the serial was featured after the scene of his assassination in the ending episode. The nasheed, entitled "Salamun Alayka Ya Omar Al Faarouq", was sung by the Kuwaiti Quran reciter Mishary Al-Afasy.

Receptions from Islamic religious scholars
Saleh Al-Fawzan, Grand Mufti of Saudi Arabia (Abdul-Aziz ibn Abdullah Al Shaykh), Al-Azhar University, Abdul Azīz bin Fahd, Muhammad Al-Munajid, Abdullah bin Zayed Al Nahyan, Saleh al-Maghamsi and many other Islamic scholars viewed the series negatively.

The Grand Mufti of the Kingdom and the head of the Council of Senior Religious Scholars, Abdul-Aziz ibn Abdullah Al Shaykh,  criminalized the dramatic action saying that those behind "Umar Al Farooq" series have committed a "grave mistake and a crime" by spending their money on the production of such TV work. He also said that he is against the idea of producing the series that "displays the biography of the rightly guided caliphs in a manner that is doomed to wound and criticism." In his Friday sermon, he called for "avoiding these devious ways, which are doomed to offend in these symbols." He added, "These films and series do not bring or mean goodness, and whatever those who prepared it who claim intellectual enlightenment, they are wrong in what they have walked and know that what they offer is dangerous, wrong and crime." The Sheikh did not differ in that from what was issued by Al-Azhar Al-Sharif, who had forbidden the embodiment of the Prophets, the Companions, the House of the Ten, and the Ten Missionaries of Paradise in any artwork.

On other part, Sheikh Saleh Al-Fawzan, a member of the Senior Scholars Committee and a member of the Standing Committee for Issuing Fatwas, forbade watching the series, recalling "the consensus of scholars and the Muslim World League to prohibit the representation of the Companions, may God be pleased with them." Everything that comes from Qatar is doubtful of its intentions Many writers wondered why this seasonal controversy takes place around the Ramadan series ?, recalling the controversy raised by Mustafa El Akkad's "The Message".

Salman al-Awda, Yūsuf al-Qaraḍawī, Yasir Qadhi, Alī al-Sallabī and Khaled al-Musleh viewed the series positively.

Zakir Naik gave a mixed review of the series, in a video of his official YouTube channel, he said, "99.9% drama or movie in the name of Islam today is not 100% Islamic and no one can give fatwa that watching them are halal. If you can live without seeing them, then don't see it. Read Quran and sahih hadith, it will be best and harmfree option. But if any Muslim is hooked on wathing hollywood and bollywood movies and dramas and feels too much hard to reject the habit of watching them, then it will be lesser sin for them in watching these series than seeing hollywood and bollywood vulgarism and obscenity...Firstly I will suggest them to watch The Message movie, then I will suggest them to watch Omar series... There is a series called Omar series, made on the life of Caliph Omar, made by MBC, funded by Qatar Foundation. There are not all things Islamic, there are ladies without hijab, there is music in it. But the verse of Quran they quoted somehow, it is wonderful, most of the hadith are authentic, a few of them are problematic."
In reaction of Naik's view about the series, Assim Al-Haqim said, "This is like saying masturbation is better than fornication! Or calling that drinking wine, gambling and other different sins are better than shirk or kufr! What kind of logic is this?".

International broadcasting
The series later has been broadcast in the television channels of different countries such as Turkey, Indonesia, Kosovo, Iran, Tunisia, Egypt etc. either dubbed or with native subtitle.

Traditional historicity and depictional issues
In the traditional Islamic accounts, there are two different stories found about the conversion of Umar, the story which has been depicted in the story, some scholars argue that the story is not authentic or reasonably weak according to reliable chain rather than declaring authenticity to the second story of conversion, where Omar became convinced to convert hearing the Quran recitation of Muhammad in prayer outside the Kaaba, then made himself hidden from the people for some days immediate after the conversion, and Al-As ibn Wa'il saved the converted Umar from the attack of enraged people. In the events of the Islamic prophet Muhammad's living era, Muhammad himself, his children and wives were not depicted but many direct actions of him have been shown redirected from any other sahaba near to him for the restrictions and limitations of Muhammad's visual depiction in the Islamic world. Although in a sequence before the death of Abu Bakr, there was a shadow depiction of Aisha shown silently conversing with her father. The dress code of male companions after conversion period was also controversial, mostly for wearing gowns below ankle, which was strongly prohibited by Muhammad, and tradition says that, all the companions always used to wear clothes over ankle. Besides, in the event of the battle of Yamama, the characters of the companions behind of Khalid bin Walid have been shown to give the slogan "ya Muhammada" (O, for Muhammad), which was a subject of controversy about historicity among some salafi clerics. They argued that it could not be told by them because calling on any other except Allah is a form of polytheism (Shirk). Historical reference says that Umayyah ibn Khalaf was killed by a group of Muslims led by Bilal ibn Rabah, but in the series, Bilal ibn Rabah has been shown to kill Umayyah ibn Khalaf by himself. In a scene of Caliphate of Abu Baqr, the character of Abu Bakr is seen wearing a thawb spreading it's back on the ground which is haram in Islam.

As for the role of Omar is one of the first tools of the weakness of the work technically where the strange cold performance and the rigidity of features and divisions of his face, even with events that require a human interaction natural and unchanging.

The series also missed the historical role of the Arab tribes allied to Quraish in the invasion of one of them, including the Ahbish of Kenana, as well as the role of Arab tribes in the invasion of the trench and Taif so that the work was limited to the tribe of Quraish as well as the tribe of Ghutfan and absent from work tribes that had a presence in the historical biography of these conversations, such as the tribe of Selim and Kenana The Bani Asad tribe, the Hawazin tribe and other Arab tribes on which the Arab community of the Arabian Peninsula was built at that time. 

 However, in the tenth episode Abu Jahal is seen delivering the plan. Also, the first episodes show the love affair of Wahshi ibn Harb with Rayhana bint Zayd (acted by Bernadette Hodeib), before and in the early days of the arrival of Islam, the historical authenticity of which is unknown. Rayhana bint Zayd later converted to Islam

See also

 List of Islamic films
 Muhammad in film
 Muhammad: The Last Prophet
 The Message (1976 film)
 Muhammad: The Messenger of God
 Muhammad: The Final Legacy
 Salah Al-deen Al-Ayyobi
 Bab Al-Hara
 Bilal (film)
 Dirilis: Ertugrul
 Fetih 1453
 He Who Said No (film)
 Kuruluş: Osman
 Muhammad Al-Munajjid
 Mukhtarnameh
 Muhteşem Yüzyıl
 Prophet Joseph (TV series)
 Yunus Emre: Askin Yolculugu

References

External links
 Official page on mbc.net.
 
 Official Trailer
 Database on elcinema.com.
 "Omar" the app - MBC group's official comprehensive application about Omar series

Umar
Qatari historical television series
Arabic-language television shows
Films about Muhammad
2012 television films
2012 television series debuts
2012 television series endings
2012 television specials
Television series about Islam
Television series set in the 7th century